Selective Service Act may refer to:

 Selective Service Act of 1917, or Selective Draft Act, enacted April 28, 1917, for the American entry into World War I
 Selective Training and Service Act of 1940, enacted September 16, 1940, in preparation for the American entry into World War II
 Selective Service Act of 1948, enacted June 24, 1948, now known as the Military Selective Service Act

See also
 Military Service Act (disambiguation)
 National Service Act (disambiguation)